Detachment R (also known as the U.S. Army Russian Area School) was a special U.S. Army School initially located in a former Wehrmacht garrison in Oberammergau and later moved to Regensburg, Germany, where it remained from 1950 to 1954, when it was moved back to Oberammergau. 

The school operated as the two-year final component of the Army's Foreign Area Specialist Training (FAST) Program in Russian and was designed as a full-immersion experience in the language, economics, and culture of the Soviet Union. The first component of the FAST program involved a one-year Russian course at the Army Language School in Monterey, California, and was followed by a year at Columbia University studying Russian history, economics, political science, and other topics of strategic importance.

Detachment R was described at length by Peter Bridges, former U.S. ambassador to Somalia, in his 2000 book, Safirka: An American Envoy:

Bridges goes on to describe the structure of the program, its leadership, and its faculty:

References

Military education and training in the United States